Gymnast II is an outdoor 1985 bronze sculpture by William Tucker, installed in Houston's Lillie and Hugh Roy Cullen Sculpture Garden, in the U.S. state of Texas.

See also

 List of public art in Houston

References 

1985 sculptures
Bronze sculptures in Texas
Lillie and Hugh Roy Cullen Sculpture Garden